Devonia may refer to:

 Devonia was one of the GWR 3031 Class locomotives that were built for and run on the Great Western Railway between 1891 and 1915
 Devonia (steamer), a passenger ferry, formerly named the Scillonian before 2004
 Devonia, Tennessee, a town in the USA